is a Japanese footballer who plays for SC Sagamihara.

Club statistics
Updated to 23 February 2016.

References

External links

Profile at SC Sagamihara

1990 births
Living people
Takushoku University alumni
Association football people from Saitama Prefecture
Japanese footballers
J3 League players
Japan Football League players
SC Sagamihara players
Association football midfielders
21st-century Japanese people